The 205th 'Atul' (Hero) Corps was a corps-level formation of the Afghan National Army. Its headquarter were located in Kandahar and it was responsible for the south of the country (Kandahar, Zabul, Oruzgan, Helmand and Nimruz provinces), partnered with the ISAF's Regional Command South.

The Corps consisted of four brigades, a commando battalion and three garrisons. The Corps had integrated artillery and air lift capacity.

General Shafiqullah Rasulzai was appointed as the commander of the Corps in late November/December 2020. He was also the last commander of the Corps. In August 2021, the Corps was destroyed during the Taliban offensive and in Battle of Kandahar.

History
The establishment of the corps started when the first commander, Gul Aqa Nahib, and some of his staff were appointed on 1 September 2004. The corps was officially established in Kandahar on 19 September 2004.

Since August 2008, the Corps moved over 90,000 tonnes of supplies using Mi-17 helicopters of the Afghan Air Force. Three of the 205th Corps' four infantry brigades were assessed as capable of conducting independent operations with minimal support from their combat advisors. "One of the brigades recently planned, executed and sustained themselves during a seven-day operation where they drove deep into what is called an enemy sanctuary or enemy safe haven to destroy identified enemy forces," a U.S. advisor said in December 2008. "They were successful leading the operation, with less than 30 mentors and 20 other coalition soldiers, in addition to their 300 ANA ground force," he said. "That was a great example of ANA’s capability to lead and conduct their own operations."

The Corps' 3rd Brigade was heavily involved in fighting the Taliban and Al-Qaeda in Helmand province, alongside British troops deployed as part of Operation Herrick.

The Corps began formation with Kalashnikov rifles and miscellaneous civilian vehicles, but under coalition tutelage was reequipped with Western equipment.

The Corps also supported an ANA regional hospital located in Kandahar, adjacent to Kandahar Airfield, dedicated to the security forces. It was a $5 million medical facility that also serves a trauma center.

2021 Taliban offensive
In August 2021, the corps was destroyed during the Taliban offensive and in Battle of Kandahar.

Provisional order of battle

Headquarters, Camp Hero, Kandahar
Commando Battalion
Regional logistics depot
1st Brigade, Camp Hero, Kandahar
2nd Brigade, Qalat, Zabul
3rd Brigade, FOB Pasab, Zhari District, Kandahar commanded by Brigadier General Murtaza
4th Brigade, Multi National Base Tarin Kot, Tarin Khowt, Oruzgan, commanded by Brigadier General Zafar Khan (redesignated brigade of another corps which was transferred into the 205th Corps' area of responsibility)

Each brigade had three infantry battalions, a combat support battalion, some with D-30 howitzers, and a combat service support battalion.

See also 

 List of Afghan Armed Forces installations
 List of NATO installations in Afghanistan

References

Corps of Afghanistan
Military units and formations established in 2004